Suja Varunee is an Indian actress who has appeared in Tamil, Kannada, Telugu, and Malayalam language films. She is the winner of BB Jodigal (season 2).

Career
Aged fourteen, Suja was selected to portray the leading role in the coming-of-age, romantic drama Plus Two (2002) after being recommended to the film's director Ramana by her neighbour Rajarajan, who was a cinematographer. Her parents were initially reluctant to allow Suja to act in films at such a young age, but later agreed. The film took a low-profile opening at the box office and did not perform well, prompting Suja to take a break from the film industry. In 2004, Suja was offered a chance to perform in a dance number in the Srikanth–starrer Varnajalam (2004), which she accepted, prompting several other film makers to approach her for similar roles. Throughout the mid-2000s, Suja became popular for such glamorous, single song appearances and worked on projects including Maayavi (2005), Pallikoodam (2007), Kuselan (2008) and Jayamkondaan (2008). Amidst several appearances in single songs, Suja had the opportunity to portray minor supporting roles in films including A. K. Lohithadas's Kasthuri Maan (2005) and Masala (2005). Suja has since reflected on that period in her career and stated she "used to get song offers almost every other day" but "did not know then that the industry would brand [her] as an item girl" and that she "did not have the proper guidance".

Following her appearance in the Rajinikanth-starrer Kuselan (2008), Suja actively supports Patali Makkal Katchi and sought to shed her image of being a glamorous dancer and move towards portraying supporting roles. The director of Kuselan, P. Vasu, supported her move and cast her in two of his subsequent films – the Kannada horror-comedy Aptharakshaka (2010) and its Telugu remake, Nagavalli (2010). The roles meant that she received further opportunities in the Telugu language with roles in films including Gundello Godari (2013) and Doosukeltha (2013), as well as the lead role in the low-budget comedy film Alibaba Okkade Donga (2014) opposite Ali. Simultaneously, she began to work in key roles in Tamil films, winning acclaim for her role as a traditional village girl in Milaga (2010), while also playing key roles in black comedy Settai (2013) and science-fiction film, Appuchi Gramam (2014). Suja won acclaim for her portrayal of a fiery, rustic woman in the village drama, Kidaari (2016), where she starred alongside Sasikumar.

In 2017, she expressed her disappointment of her scenes in films being cut through a Twitter post. The move followed reports that her scenes were edited out in the film, Kuttram 23 (2017). She has finished her commitments for films including the Arulnithi-starrer Iravukku Aayiram Kangal, Thamira's Aan Devathai, Arun Vijay's Vaa Deal and Sathru among other projects. In 2017, Suja took part in the reality television show Bigg Boss hosted by Kamal Haasan, where she entered on day 52.

Personal life 
Suja is wife of the actor Shivaji Dev, the son of film producer Ramkumar Ganesan.  In August 2019 she gave birth to their first child a baby boy Adhvaaith

Filmography

Television

References

External links
 

Actresses in Tamil cinema
Living people
Actresses in Kannada cinema
Actresses in Malayalam cinema
Indian film actresses
Actresses in Telugu cinema
21st-century Indian actresses
Actresses from Chennai
1984 births
Bigg Boss (Tamil TV series) contestants
Actresses in Tamil television